The 1983 Women's Hockey World Cup was the fifth edition of the Women's Hockey World Cup field hockey tournament. It was held from 10 April to 23 April in Kuala Lumpur, Malaysia.

It was won by the Netherlands, who defeated Canada 4–2 in the final. Host nation Malaysia did not participate in the tournament.

Results

Pool A

Pool B

Ninth to twelfth place classification

Crossover

Eleventh and twelfth place

Ninth and tenth place

Fifth to eighth place classification

Crossover

Seventh and eighth place

Fifth and sixth place

First to fourth place classification

Semi-finals

Third and fourth place

Final

Final standings

References

External links
Official FIH website

Women's Hockey World Cup
Hockey World Cup
International women's field hockey competitions hosted by Malaysia
World Cup
1980s in Kuala Lumpur
Sport in Kuala Lumpur
Hockey World Cup